Jacobus Martinus Kaper (born 12 September 1931) is a biochemist and virologist who worked at the Henry A. Wallace Beltsville Agricultural Research Center of the Agricultural Research Service of the United States. He has performed research on the cucumber mosaic virus.

Kaper was born in Madjalengka, Dutch East Indies. He was elected corresponding member of the Royal Netherlands Academy of Arts and Sciences in 1980.

References

1931 births
Living people
20th-century Dutch East Indies people
Members of the Royal Netherlands Academy of Arts and Sciences
United States Department of Agriculture people
American virologists